The Collège-lycée Jacques-Decour is a school in Paris, France, on avenue Trudaine.

History
The school was founded as the private Collège Sainte-Barbe in 1821 and renamed Collège Rollin in 1830. It was transplanted in 1876 from the Quartier Latin to avenue Trudaine, near Montmartre. The old building on rue Lhomond became the site of the Protestant Faculty of Theology in Paris in 1877. Collège Rollin was granted municipal status, and became Lycée Rollin in 1919. It is the only secondary school in Paris to have taken the name of a former teacher, Jacques Decour, a French Resistance fighter in 1944.

Selected alumni
 Charles Forbes René de Montalembert
 Lucien Lévy
 Édouard Manet
 Félix Ravaisson
 Georges Sorel

References

External links
 

Lycées in Paris
Schools in Paris